Tax Crossroads is an unincorporated community in Talbot County, Georgia.

History
A variant name of the community was "Tax". The community was named for the fact tax collectors would pick up tax returns at the local country store. A post office called Tax was established in 1893, and remained in operation until 1910.

References

Unincorporated communities in Georgia (U.S. state)
Unincorporated communities in Talbot County, Georgia